Matthew Dallman (born March 9, 1985) is an American soccer player.

Career

Youth, College and Amateur
Dallman played high school soccer for Hood River Valley High School, playing on the varsity team for three seasons, earning a place on the second-team all-state squad as a senior. He then attended Chico State for a 1/2 year, but was a medical redshirt. In January 2004, he transferred to the University of Portland, where he was the team's fourth-leading scorer, with five goals and three assists. In 2005, Dallman started 17 games at midfield for the Pilots, recording a goal and four assists during the campaign. In 2006, he played in 19 games for Portland, leading the team in points with 10, with 2 goals and 6 assists.

Dallman also spent the 2006 season with Bradenton Academics in the USL Premier Development League where he made 14 appearances, recorded a league high 7 assists, and scored two goals.

Professional
Attempting to take advantage of his English heritage, Dallman set up multiple trials with European clubs following the close of the 2006 college season. He first went to Bolton Wanderers on February 15, 2007 to try and earn a spot with the FA Premier League club, before trying out for FC Nordsjælland and Bayern Munich II.

After completing his trials, and waiting for offers from clubs, Dallman decided to sign with FC Nordsjælland, formally agreeing to a contract on March 19, 2007. The deal was short-term, and kept him with the Danish club until the end of their season. He never received playing clearance from the league, and only played with their reserve squad.

Following his short stint with Nordsjælland, Dallman went on trial with Swedish side IF Bunkeflo.  However, the two sides could not reach an agreement. Eventually, Dallman signed short-term with SC Wiedenbrück in Germany and appeared in 16 matches without scoring a goal before leaving the club. After trials with VfL Wolfsburg and Bolton Wanderers, Dallman agreed to a two-year deal with German Bundesliga club Arminia Bielefeld where he made 31 appearances and scored eight goals for their second team.  He then moved to Sportfreunde Siegen and spent two and a half seasons with the club before returning to the United States in January 2012.

Dallman returned to the United States and was invited into training camp by Major League Soccer club Chivas USA with an opportunity at earning a roster spot.  Dallman joined Chivas, and made several appearances, but suffered a hamstring injury early in the 2012 season which resulted in his release from Chivas. Dallman then joined USL Pro club Pittsburgh Riverhounds.  He made his debut for the club on July 27, 2012, in a 4-1 victory over Antigua Barracuda. In total, Dallman appeared in 4 matches, tallying 1 assist in 314 minutes, after joining the club near the end of the 2012 season.

For the 2013 USL Pro season, Dallman appeared in 23 of 26 regular season matches for the Riverhounds and became a central figure in the offense.  In total, he scored two goals and tallied 12 assists meaning that he assisted on exactly one third of Pittsburgh's 36 goals for the season.  His 12 assist total was enough to put him tops in the league in that category for the season and set the all-time record for assists in a single season in the process.  
 With 16 points, Dallman was also 21st in the league in that statistic. Dallman also holds the current all time assist record in the USL-Pro.

Personal life
Dallman's father played soccer for Portland State, and his great-grandfather, Roderick Welsh, played professionally for Portsmouth and Port Vale of the English First Division.

Honors
USL Pro single season assist record (12, in 2013)
USL Pro All-League First Team: 2013

References

External links
 Portland Pilots bio

1985 births
Living people
American soccer players
American expatriate soccer players
Portland Pilots men's soccer players
IMG Academy Bradenton players
FC Nordsjælland players
SC Wiedenbrück 2000 players
Arminia Bielefeld players
Sportfreunde Siegen players
Pittsburgh Riverhounds SC players
American people of English descent
Soccer players from Portland, Oregon
Expatriate men's footballers in Denmark
American expatriate soccer players in Germany
USL League Two players
People from Hood River, Oregon
Association football midfielders
USL Championship players